Aleptinoides is a monotypic moth genus of the family Noctuidae comprising a single species, Aleptinoides ochrea. Both the genus and species were described by William Barnes and James Halliday McDunnough in 1912.

References

Acronictinae
Noctuoidea genera
Taxa named by William Barnes (entomologist)
Taxa named by James Halliday McDunnough